Wild Women is a 1951 American adventure film directed by Norman Dawn and starring Lewis Wilson, Dana Broccoli and Clarence Brooks. A low-budget production which utilized stock footage, it is also known by the alternative titles of Bowanga Bowanga and White Sirens of Africa.

Plot 
An American big game hunter named Trent and his friend an Italian count are on safari in Africa. They encounter a tribe of amazons, fearsome female warriors that bring back memories of Trent's living in the area as a boy.

Cast
Lewis Wilson as Trent
Dana Broccoli as Queen 
Morton C. Thompson as Kirby 
Don Orlando as Count Sparafucile
Clarence Brooks as Sungu
Charlene Hawks as Owoona 
Frances Dubay as High Priestess
Leah Wakefield as Head Conspirator
Zona Siggins as Ulama Girl
Devvy Davenport as Ulama Girl
Mary Brandon as Ulama Girl
Mary Lou Miner as Ulama Girl
Barbara Reynolds as Ulama Girl
Joyce Nevins as Ulama Girl

References

External links

1951 adventure films
American adventure films
Films directed by Norman Dawn
American black-and-white films
Films set in Africa
1950s English-language films
1950s American films